The Foundation Against Intolerance and Racism (FAIR) is an American nonprofit organization, founded in 2021, that campaigns against diversity and inclusion programs, ethnic studies curricula, and antiracism initiatives that it calls Critical Race Theory (CRT).

FAIR describes itself as a "nonpartisan organization dedicated to advancing civil rights and liberties for all Americans, and promoting a common culture based on fairness, understanding, and humanity." FAIR's board of advisers has included human rights activist Ayaan Hirsi Ali, musician and activist Daryl Davis, conservative activist Christopher Rufo, former Fox newscaster Megyn Kelly, journalist Bari Weiss, and academics Jonathan Haidt, Glenn Loury, John McWhorter, and Steven Pinker.

Founding and advisors
FAIR was founded in early 2021 by Bion Bartning, a co-founder of Eos Products. Bartning, who is of mixed Ashkenazi Jewish, Mexican, and Yaqui heritage, had sent his children to attend Riverdale Country School, a private school located in the The Bronx, in New York City. Bartning observed his children's schooling in the fall of 2020, which was conducted virtually over Zoom. The school introduced a theme of "allyship" for the schoolyear, promoting the idea that members of "privileged classes" should advance the interests and the voices of oppressed groups over their own. The students were shown a video of the school's mascot instructing them that they needed to "check each other's words and actions". After removing his children from Riverdale Country School, Bartning founded FAIR to oppose antiracist efforts that he views as "a kind of religion taking hold in American education that forces people into categories according to their race." He argued the initiatives did more harm than good by focusing on differences between people. Bartning established FAIR in January 2021 and expressed his concerns about how schools teach about racism in a March Wall Street Journal opinion piece.

The organization is structured as a nonprofit, and utilizes United Charitable, an organization that works with wealth advisors and donors to minimize tax liability, for fundraising. Bartning is the organization's CEO.

FAIR describes itself as non-partisan and "pro-human". Bartning is a self-described independent who says he grew up with liberal values. FAIR has a multi-racial, multi-ethnic board of advisors comprising around 50 people, including journalists, academics, artists, and human rights activists. Advisors include former Fox News host Megyn Kelly, anti-racist activist Daryl Davis, human rights activist Ayaan Hirsi Ali, linguist John McWhorter, economist Glenn Loury, and writers Bari Weiss and Abigail Shrier. The organization resists claims of partisanship, and its board includes cognitive scientist Steven Pinker, a Democratic Party donor, as well as venture capitalist and Republican donor Alexander Lloyd. Conservative activist Christopher Rufo was formerly an advisory board member. The Washington Post has called FAIR a conservative group.

Activism and positions

Opposition to Critical Race Theory 
Almost all the cases profiled on FAIR's website involved battling critical race theory (CRT). A FAIR spokesperson denied the organization was founded to combat CRT and stated that it seeks to advocate for "one human race". FAIR hosts a message board where members discuss their activism against CRT in schools. Visitors to FAIR's website can report schools and organizations for teaching about diversity, equity, and inclusion.

Critics have likened their approach to an All Lives Matter mentality, which was a response to the Black Lives Matter movement that sought to delegitimize the notion that Black people have been systematically discriminated against in the United States. According to experts and educators interviewed by Lancaster Online, what FAIR calls CRT is not CRT, but a catch-all term for anything race-related. CRT is a legal study of the ways in which race has been created, defined, and embedded into law throughout American history.

In January 2021, a mother in Nevada claimed that her biracial son could not opt out of a mandatory sociology class that "appeared to be teaching students critical race theory and intersectionality". Her case was supported by Schoolhouse Rights, a project of the anti-LGBTQ group International Organization for the Family, the anti-LGBT Alliance Defending Freedom, and FAIR

In April, a federal grant program supporting American history and civics education projects that, among other criteria, “incorporate racially, ethnically, culturally, and linguistically diverse perspectives” was opposed by Mitch McConnell and FAIR. FAIR also highlighted, as a "profile in courage", a legal challenge to a debt relief program for Black farmers.

In June, FAIR started a campaign to support Dana Stangel-Plower, who resigned from the Dwight-Englewood School due to what she called "essentialist, racialist thinking". In her resignation letter, which was published by FAIR, she stated "this year, administrators continue to assert D-E's policy that we are hiring 'for diversity,' D-E has become a workplace that is hostile toward educators based solely on their immutable traits."

In August, approximately 50 people gathered at the American Legion in Island Pond to criticize CRT. Featured speakers included state Senator Russ Ingalls, who has criticized teaching about race, and Ben Morely, who started the Vermont chapter of FAIR. Morley encouraged the crowd to vote down school budgets, file Freedom of Information Act requests to find what teachers are teaching, and take legal action against school districts if they found "evidence of indoctrination or discrimination". In December, Morley announced that he was running for a seat on the Lake Region Union High School board in Orleans County, Vermont. Local papers in Vermont published commentaries from parents that copied, word-for-word, a template letter from FAIR.

In September, conservative speakers at a Springfield forum about CRT denounced diversity education curriculums ahead of a school district discussion about the use of diversity, equity, and inclusion education in Springfield schools. Gregory Thayer, the founder of Vermonters for Vermont, objected to the term "equity" and advocated for the curricular approach outlined by FAIR.

In May 2022, FAIR wrote a letter to the Superintendent of Evanston/Skokie School District 65, Devon Horton, claiming that lessons teach young children that people are in danger because of whiteness, that racism is exclusively associated with whiteness, and that it claims without qualification that white people have more opportunities than "non-white" people.

In June, the University of California shelved a draft for a proposal that would add a semester of ethnic studies as a requirement for admission to UC. The new requirement would substitute for an elective or be the focus of an English or history course and not an additional course. FAIR wrote a letter opposing the policy, claiming it would lead to content that is highly political and ideological. The letter asserted that the proposed model promotes "divisive and radical ideas that pressure students to become activists to foment a political revolution".

A statement from the El Paso/Teller County chapter of FAIR opposed the equity policy adopted by the Colorado Springs School District 11 in May 2020. The policy, which was developed with input from more than 2.000 community members in 2019, said that the district would support the equitable allocation of funding, diverse hiring practices, and a "culturally responsive" curriculum and training for staff about historic achievement inequities between white and nonwhite students.

In January 2022, Joseph Boyle of the El Paso-Teller chapter of FAIR criticized an audit by the American Institute of Research that was paid for by Colorado Springs School District 11. The audit found gaps in student achievement between schools with a majority of Black and Hispanic or students in poverty compared to majority white or wealthy schools, in addition to gaps disparities between students of color and white students attending the same schools. The report attributed the gaps to a concentration of high-needs students, failure to spend more money where it was most needed, inequitable access to the best teachers, implicit bias, and a lack of diversity among teachers. The audit found that while 49% of students were people of color, only 19% of the teachers were. Boyle stated the "equity audit appears not to be a product of open inquiry, but the result of a quest to justify a predetermined ideological conclusion."

Members of FAIR criticized the equity push as another form of racism and "race essentialism". Alexis Knox-Miller, the newly appointed equity director, hosted "equity cafes" where parents and community members could discuss the reports. Boyle repeatedly asked questions and was told that he was not allowed. Knox-Miller stated that FAIR "followed me to every community cafe" and were "posining the room". Knox-Miller stated Boyle's complaint that equity work looked at the world through a racial lens felt personal to her, stating "I’m a Black woman, and I’m sorry, the world looks at me through a racialized lens. We’re not colorblind."

In September, Jeff Campbell, leader of the Twin Cities chapter of FAIR, wrote a statement to the Minnesota Professional Educator Licensing and Standards Board (PELSB) criticizing their new standards, which included language requiring teachers to acknowledge the various backgrounds and gender identities of their students. Since 2020, teachers have had to participate in cultural competency training to renew their licenses, so the proposed changes would make new teacher licenses match the renewal process. Campbell stated that students are best served when they are all treated the same. FAIR argued that the new standards fall outside the agency's authority and that their implementation would complicate educator licensing requirements amid a teacher shortage.

Emory Free Speech Forum 
In November 2021, Emory Law School's Student Bar Association (SBA) rejected a charter requested by the Emory Free Speech Forum (EFSF). The charter would have meant that the organization could receive University funding, use University spaces, and advertise at the school's activity fair. The SBA wrote that it denied the charter because the group's goals overlapped with other established clubs and because they were concerned with the lack of safeguards such as moderators to facilitate discussions. The EFSF wrote to FAIR and the Foundation for Individual Rights in Education (FIRE) for assistance. Letitia Kim, managing director of the Legal Network at FAIR, wrote a letter to the SBA president, Jadyn Taylor, urging the board to reverse their decision to reject the charter proposal. In late March, the SBA granted EFSF's charter. When the EFSF began to promote their event with FAIR titled "A Pro-Human Approach to Civil Rights", students began to protest the event and FAIR, describing it as a transphobic organization opposed to CRT.

Gender 

In September 2021, Ben Morley, who started the Vermont chapter of FAIR, wrote a letter to his son's teacher, which was posted on the conservative online publication True North Reports, questioning why his son was asked to share his pronouns in an eighth-grade humanities class.

In December, Leticia Kim, managing director of FAIR's legal network, argued that a school questionnaire at Jamesville-Dewitt central school district which asked students their preferred pronouns violated the First Amendment of the United States Constitution since "requiring students to choose their pronouns is effectively demanding that they affirm a particular set of ideological beliefs about sex and gender, which many do not share" and "while teachers should permit students to declare their pronouns if they so choose, they may not require them to do so."

In May 2022, FAIR suggested that lessons on gender and pronouns in the Evanston/Skokie School District 65 may be unconstitutional. FAIR stated that "teaching students that they must use alternative pronouns and announce their own may also violate their religious rights" and argued that lessons on pronouns were not age appropriate for those aged 4–9 since they "believe there are significant concerns as to whether these subjects are appropriate for such young children" who are "not yet developed or informed eough to fully understand, analyze, or critique those concepts."

When asked about local schools and treatment of LGBTQIA+ issues, Joel Sternstein, leader of the Evanston FAIR chapter, stated they don't get into hypotheticals.

In 2022, the Fairfax County School Board added protections for transgender students encountering misgendering in school in the 2022-2023 Student Rights and Responsibilities (SR&R) handbook. FAIR raised concerns that it would conflict with the first amendment's free speech protections. FAIR attorney Leigh Ann O'Neill was pleased to see the term "malicious" in the document to discern between events of malintent and free speech and stated "I think that was a positive adjustment that the school board made because it is taking into account the intention of the student who might have a sincerely held belief that prohibits them from using another student’s chosen pronoun."

In August, a parent at New Trier High School submitted an anonymous complaint to FAIR complaining that surveys given to students asked for their preferred pronouns and who those pronouns could be used around. FAIR alleged in a letter to the district that requiring students to announce their pronouns violates free speech pronouns under the First Amendment because it forces them to adhere to an "ideology" that can conflict with religious beliefs. Letitia Kim stated that teachers should instead encourage students to tell teachers which pronouns they use without compelling others to do the same. She stated it can get tricky in instances where a student refuses to use a classmate's pronouns, and that "we do encourage everybody to be respectful of everybody else but we also recognize that the use of pronouns is a little bit more complicated, it’s not like giving a name or giving your address or giving something similar. It really carries with it a set of underlying beliefs that some students and some individuals may not accept or may not believe in". The letter also stated that withholding a student's gender identity or pronouns from a parent infringes on parental rights, referencing the Fourteenth Amendment, but that students should justify their reasoning for not informing their parents if they feel unsafe.

In 2022, FAIR opened six chapters in Ontario alone. Their main focus has been opposing Bill 67, which would require boards to implement anti-racist policies and redefine racism to include systemic and unconscious forms. FAIR Ontario claimed that the new definition "endorses racism against white people". One of FAIR's most prominent allies is Parents As First Educators (PAFE), an Ontario-based organization founded in 2011 to protest progressive changes to the Catholic School Board's sex education curriculum, such as introducing the concept of gender identity and mentioning contraception in elementary school, in favor of an abstinence-first curriculum. PAFE then began to campaign against federal bills banning conversion therapy. The "Blueprint for Canada" campaign is a shared policy platform intended to be adopted by candidates who support at least 80% of its points. Blueprint for Canada was forced to take down its lists of recommended anti-LGBTQ2S+ candidates over potential violations of provincial election regulation.

On October 17, FAIR hosted a webinar titled "Understanding Gender Dysphoria and Its Impact on Clinical Care" with Lisa Littman, Stella O'Malley, Zander Kreig, Teva Johnstone, and Dr. Carrie Mendoza. Littman coined the term "rapid-onset gender dysphoria" in a 2018 study based on parent reports on three websites known for their transphobic discourse. On October 20, FAIR retweeted FAIR legal analyst Reid Newton's tweet promoting a piece written by her and FAIR attorney Leigh-Ann O’Neill which criticized the U.S. Department of Health and Human Services' proposed Nondiscrimination in Health Programs and Activities Rule which would protect individuals’ ability to receive gender-affirming care. Newton and O'Neill argued that because the impacts of gender-transition care are not fully known, healthcare providers may be "hesitant to go along with this new mandate at the potential expense of their patients." Newton maintained that they weren't transphobic, saying the article's goal was the ensure transgender patients know both sides so they can give informed consent.

Other lawsuits 
In 2020, complaints from various colleagues prompted Hennepin Healthcare to remove Dr. Tara Gustilo as chair of the Department of Obstetrics and Gynecology. In 2017, two Black doctors complained to the hospital's human resources team that they experienced a "pattern of microagressions" and "subtle racism" at work. By the summer of 2020, Gustilo was making posts on Facebook criticizing Black Lives Matter and "critical race theory", supporting Donald Trump, and calling COVID-19 "the China virus". By the Fall of 2020, at least four doctors on her team told leadership that Gustilo was "injecting her own political views into the workplace and causing great discomfort among the staff". Hennepin Healthcare offered a mediator to improve Gustilo's relationship with her team and hired a human resources consultant to examine morale in the department. In late 2020, the team interviewed 14 of Gustilo's colleagues and stated "Gustilo’s behavior had traumatized the department. Recurring themes included that Gustilo would not listen to suggestions or different viewpoints, and doctors feared retribution if they disagreed with her." In January 2021, the hospital presented her with the findings and asked her to voluntarily step down as chair. When she refused, 13 of the 14 doctors in her department wrote a letter detailing their lack of confidence in her leadership and outlining how she lost their trust. In April, 25 members of the Medical Executive committee voted to remove her from her position as chair. In June 2021, with the help of FAIR, the Upper Midwest Law Center, and America First Legal, Gustilo filed a complaint with the Equal Employment Opportunity Commission alleging she had been discriminated against due to her race. In February 2022 she filed a lawsuit seeking over $75,000 in damages. The lawsuit also challenged the hospital's practice of "racially concordant care", which she labeled "segregation". The program in question was implemented due to evidence that rates of infant mortality and pregnancy-related deaths are higher among Black and Native American women, but disparities lessen when Black or Native American providers are involved.

In June 2021, Lee County Sheriff Carmine Marceno arrested a 10-year-old boy for allegedly making written threats to commit a school shooting at his elementary school in text messages to a friend. Letitia Kim stated that the messages did not contain any kind of threat but did include Google images of assault rifles. At the time of the arrest, Marceno deemed the messages to be a "fake threat", but arrested him anyways stating "this child made a fake threat, and now he's experiencing real consequences". The boy's father maintained his son's innocence, stating the texts about money and guns were a bad joke about scamming a friend out of money and were not a threat. FAIR filed an official request to the U.S. Department of Justice to investigate the sheriff's office for law enforcement misconduct.

In June 2022, Brown University expanded eligibility for a "Mindfulness-Based Stress Reduction" teacher training class that had originally restricted enrollment exclusively to racial and ethnic minorities. FAIR submitted a complaint via letter to Brown University President Christina Paxson which accused the university of segregating the class and violating Title VI of the Civil Rights Act. The class was subsequently opened to all students. Eric Loucks, the director of Brown's Mindfulness center, stated "the intent is to reach future teachers who have a special interest in or history of personal engagement with the experiences of Black, Indigenous, and/or Latino/Latina/Latinx peoples and others who have been underrepresented in the mindfulness field, this is regardless of the participant's race".

The same month, Keith Ray, a part-time teaching artist at New 42, filed a lawsuit accusing the organization of discriminating against white employees, which was supported by FAIR.

In May, FAIR filed an amicus brief in the case Students for Fair Admissions v. President and Fellows of Harvard College, arguing that group preferences are inconsistent with equality and individual rights and that they'd result in negative effects on students such as stigma, division, resentment, and dehumanization.

In July, Meg Smaker allied with FAIR to argue that her documentary "The UnRedacted", originally titled "Jihad Rehab", was being targeted since she was a white non-Muslim woman. FAIR also organized a Los Angeles screening of the film. The film followed four people who had been detained at Guantánamo Bay without trial for over a decade and who were presently detained in a rehabilitation center in Saudi Arabia. The film was condemned at its premiere at the Sundance film festival by various critics, including Muslim-American filmmakers, ex-Guantanomo detainees, and U.K. group CAGE, which advocates on behalf of those affected by the  War on Terror. The critics explicitly denied that their issues were related to her ethnicity, instead highlighting the ethics of interviewing men who'd been tortured and who could face retaliation from the Saudi government in addition to the original title and framing the men as guilty of what they'd been charged with without trial. Mohammed Al-Hamiri, who was featured in the film, told the Guardian he wasn't aware the film would be accessible internationally. Another man who was featured said he did not want to be but his concerns were discarded.

Medical issues 
Dr. Carrie Mendoza leads the medicine chapter of FAIR, and has opposed race-conscious policies in health care, saying they can interfere with doctor-patient relationships.

In response to the omicron surge in December 2021, the New York State and City health departments issued guidance on the use of COVID-19 drug treatments and therapies that were then in limited supply. The state guidance specified "non-white race or Hispanic/Latino ethnicity should be considered a risk factor, as longstanding systemic health and social inequities have contributed to an increased risk of sever illness and death from COVID-19" and the city guidance contained similar language. FAIR filed a lawsuit asking the guidance to be blocked, claiming that it discriminated against white people and also members of minority racial and ethnic groups by labeling them as more prone to disease and therefore contributing to stigma and by subjecting them to experimental treatment. The National Medical Association, which represents African American physicians, filed an amicus brief strongly supporting the guidance.

Reception
The Guardian describes FAIR as having "sprung up to spread the fear of critical race theory far and wide." Media Matters for America described the group as "deceptively named" and the San Antonio Current described it as "horribly misnamed".

Xusana Davis, Vermont's director of racial equity, called FAIR's use of rhetoric around positivity and inclusion a clever “minimization tactic" and stated “they insist on being positive and moving forward as a way to ignore or avoid the acknowledgment of harm and the consequential repair of harm,” she said.

References

External links

Organizations established in 2021
2021 establishments in New York City
Critical race theory
Non-profit organizations based in New York City
Civil rights organizations in the United States